The UEFA European Under-18 Championship 1972 Final Tournament was a youth football tournament held in Spain.

Qualification

Round 1

|}

Round 2

|}

Teams
The following teams entered the tournament. Six teams qualified (Q) and ten teams entered without playing qualification matches.

  (Q)
 
 
  (Q)
 
 
 
 
 
  (Q)
  (Q)
 
 
  (Q)
  (host)
  (Q)

Group stage

Group A

Group B

Group C

Group D

Semifinals

Third place match

Final

External links
Results by RSSSF

UEFA European Under-19 Championship
1972
Under-18
Under-18
May 1972 sports events in Europe
1972 in youth association football